Truth Channel (formerly known as Ang Dating Daan Television or ADDTV) is a Philippine religious television network. It is the flagship television network of the Members Church of God International (MCGI), together with UNTV News and Rescue, the network's carrier on free-to-air digital terrestrial television (DTT). It broadcasts 24 hours a day on Ultra High Frequency (UHF) Channel 38 (617.143 MHz) in Metro and Mega Manila, Rizal, Bulacan, Pampanga, Laguna, Cavite and some parts of Tarlac.

Its studios in the Philippines are located at the UNTV Building, 907 Brgy. Philam, EDSA Quezon City and at the ADD Convention Center, Brgy. Sampaloc, MacArthur Highway Apalit, Pampanga. It also has a broadcast facility in South America, a garage transformed into a makeshift studio in Florianópolis, Santa Catarina, Brazil, shared with MCGI's own international TV channels TV Verdade, TV La Verdad and The Truth Channel.

Its digital transmitter is located at Emerald Hills, Sumulong Highway in Antipolo, Rizal. The 16-storey UNTV Broadcast Center along EDSA Philam is currently under construction to serve as its new headquarters by 2018, and it operates 24-hours a day, with the exception of Mondays, where the channel is offline from midnight to 4 am.

Truth Channel is known for its broadcast of Itanong mo kay Soriano, a talk show in Bible Exposition format popularized by Ang Dating Daan (ADD), the longest-running religious program in the Philippines, hosted by international radio and television evangelist Bro. Eli Soriano, together with broadcast journalist UNTV-BMPI CEO, Kuya Daniel Razon.

The segment has spontaneous question and answer format where live audience ask questions to the host. The religious program airs in four languages namely Filipino, English, Portuguese and Spanish with English subtitles.

Digitalization

On September 3, 2017, Truth Channel formally ceased its test broadcast which began in the last quarter of 2014 as Ang Dating Daan Television (ADDTV) and officially launched its broadcast on digital terrestrial television, using Japan's Integrated Service Digital Broadcasting-Terrestrial (ISDB-T), the sole digital television (DTV) standard in the Philippines for its transition from analog to digital broadcast. on UHF Channel 38 as its frequency, together with the flagship station UNTV.

On the same date, an exclusive ceremonial switch-on led by then-MCGI Assistant Overall Servant Brother Daniel Razon was held at the MCGI Headquarters in Apalit, Pampanga during the "Thanksgiving of God's People" (Tagalog: Pasalamat ng Buong Bayan ng Dios) international gathering of the Members Church of God International.

Truth Channel revamped its programming line-up and introduced a new station identification (ID) and on-screen graphics to reflect major changes. It also launched its slogan "Truth Above All" where it emphasize "Truth" as the TV channel's core value based on Bible verse .

History
During UNTV's 9th anniversary celebration in 2013, Kuya Daniel Razon announced the network's ongoing transition from analog to digital broadcast. The activity includes upgrading of technical equipment and studio facilities.

After a year, UNTV began its test broadcast in Mega Manila using its new digital transmitter in Antipolo. On October 2, 2014, UNTV began its simulcast test broadcast on UHF channel 38 (617.143 MHz) along with its analog broadcast on UHF channel 37. It has two (2) standard definition (SD) channels and one 1seg or “oneseg” channel. 1seg is the common name of DTV service specifically for mobile phone devices. UNTV multi-channel line-up also included one high definition (HD) channel called “ADDTV” or “Ang Dating Daan Television” showing purely religious programs and songs of praises. Its digital broadcast can be received in Metro Manila and nearby provinces like Bulacan, Pampanga, Cavite and Rizal, using ISDB-T set top boxes including LED TV sets and mobile devices with built-in ISDB-T tuners. In a DTV signal test conducted by Philippine mobile phone brand Starmobile last April 2015, UNTV was present in eight out of 14 locations in Metro Manila with decent signal strength of three up to the maximum of four signal bars.

Programs

Current
Ang Dating Daan Worldwide Bible Study
Chained
Confessions
El Camino Antigo
Follies of the Hollies
Guilds
How Authentic The Bible Is
Itanong mo kay Soriano, Biblia ang Sasagot
O Caminho Antiguo
Straight From the Scriptures
Street Lab
Truth in Focus
World Watch

Stations

TV stations

Digital

See also
 Ang Dating Daan
 Members Church of God International
 UNTV
STV
Wish 107.5

References

External links

Members Church of God International
Progressive Broadcasting Corporation
Television stations in Metro Manila
Television channels and stations established in 2014
Digital television stations in the Philippines
2014 establishments in the Philippines
Religious television stations in the Philippines